A Cure for Wellness is a soundtrack album with original music by Benjamin Wallfisch for Gore Verbinski's film of the same name. It was released by Milan Records on February 17, 2017. Wallfisch collaborated with Verbinski to create thematic melodies in a varied score featuring orchestral ensembles, choruses, and electronics. The orchestra and choirs recorded the music at Abbey Roads Studios in London. The last track on the album is a stripped down version of a Ramones song "I Wanna be Sedated" which is performed by Mirel Wagner.

Production 
In an interview conducted by Daniel Schweiger of Film Music Magazine, Wallfisch discusses his thoughts on the film and on collaborating with Verbinski. He describes it as "the most extraordinary, visceral, uncompromising, and beautiful movies" he has worked on to date. He further mentions the film being a unique experience in terms of narrative and the central theme, and that it was an "incredible and inspiring journey" that he went on with Verbinski. Production of the score was a yearlong process. It started with a waltz featured in film for the characters to dance to on set. Following that, Wallfisch continued into Verbinski's cutting rooms where they spent 6–7 months on creating the melodic score together. Ideas were shared among all of film's crew members as they worked together closely.

Release 
Milan Records released the original soundtrack album worldwide on CD, digital, and 180gram pearlescent white vinyl. A download card for the digital version of the soundtrack is included with the vinyl packaging. The album was available for pre-order on iTunes which provided the immediate download of two tracks including "I Wanna Be Sedated" and "Bicycle". Both of the tracks premiered on BrooklynVegan.

Reception 
Jonathan Broxton from Movie Music UK gave a favorable review describing it as, "quite a superb score on all fronts." He continues to describe it as an enjoyable listen for fans of horror/thriller scores that join with the onscreen creepy scenes of the film.

Patrick Phillips of CutPrintFilm describes Wallfisch's score as music that, "shifts and turns and soars with near operatic grace.

Track listing

References 

2017 soundtrack albums